The Asia/Oceania Zone was one of the three zones of the regional Davis Cup competition in 2018.

In the Asia/Oceania Zone there were four different tiers, called groups, in which teams competed against each other to advance to the upper tier. Winners in Group II advanced to the Asia/Oceania Zone Group I. Teams who lost their respective ties competed in the relegation play-offs, with winning teams remaining in Group II, whereas teams who lost their play-offs were relegated to the Asia/Oceania Zone Group III in 2019.

Participating nations
Seeds:
 
 
 
 

Remaining nations:
 
 
 
 

Draw

 and  relegated to Group III in 2019.
 promoted to Group I in 2019.

First round

Sri Lanka vs. Thailand

Indonesia vs. Philippines

Hong Kong vs. Iran

Lebanon vs. Chinese Taipei

Second round

Philippines vs. Thailand

Lebanon vs. Hong Kong

Play-offs

Sri Lanka vs. Indonesia

Chinese Taipei vs. Iran

Third round

Thailand vs. Lebanon

References

External links
Official Website

Asia/Oceania Zone Group II
Davis Cup Asia/Oceania Zone